Woolam Peak is a small peak on the southern part of the crater rim of Mount Cumming in the Executive Committee Range, Marie Byrd Land. Mapped by United States Geological Survey (USGS) from surveys and U.S. Navy trimetrogon photography, 1958–60. Named by Advisory Committee on Antarctic Names (US-ACAN) for Alvis E. Woolam, ionospheric physicist at Byrd Station, 1959.

Mountains of Marie Byrd Land
Executive Committee Range